Chelik (also Romanized as Chelīk) is a village in Marhemetabad-e Jonubi Rural District of the Central District of Miandoab County, West Azerbaijan province, Iran. At the 2006 National Census, its population was 1,604 in 395 households. The following census in 2011 counted 1,696 people in 481 households. The latest census in 2016 showed a population of 1,765 people in 534 households; it was the largest village in its rural district.

References 

Miandoab County

Populated places in West Azerbaijan Province

Populated places in Miandoab County